Africa to the World is a debut studio album by South African DJ Sun-El Musician, released on April 20, 2018 through EL World Music. 

The album was certified gold by the Recording Industry of South Africa (RiSA).

Critical reception 
Africa to the World scored 8/10 ratings by YoMzansi.

Awards 
Africa to the World was nominated for Best Dance Album and Newcomer of the Year at the 25th South African Music Awards.

!
|-
|rowspan="2"|2019
|rowspan="2"|Africa to the World
|Newcomer of the Year
|
|rowspan="2"| 
|-
|Best Dance Album 
|

Track listing

Certifications and sales

Release and singles 
Africa to the World standard edition was released on April 20, 2018.

"Akanamali" was released on May 21, 2017 as album's lead single. The song peak at number one in South Africa.

References 

2018 debut albums
Sun-El Musician albums
EL World Music albums